</noinclude>

Thomas Murphy (born 19 March 1986) is a former Australian rules football player who played with the Hawthorn Football Club and Gold Coast Suns in the Australian Football League. Murphy was selected with the 21st pick in the 2004 AFL Draft and was a defender.

He spent the bulk of his debut year with the Box Hill Hawks at Victorian Football League level, but broke into the Hawthorn side for the final game of the year. In 2006 he added a further seven games and kicked his first goal. Murphy played 18 games in 2008 and was listed as an emergency for the 2008 Grand Final. In 2008 he mainly played on the third tall forward but due to injuries to other defenders Murphy played as the full back. He was voted Best Clubman in 2010. Prior to the 2012 AFL Grand Final between Hawthorn and Sydney, Murphy was dropped from the side and replaced by Hawthorn captain Luke Hodge. 

On 12 October 2012, Murphy signed a two-year contract with Gold Coast as an unrestricted free agent. He retired from professional football at the end of the 2014 AFL season.

Statistics

|- style=background:#EAEAEA
| 2005 ||  || 41
| 1 || 0 || 0 || 2 || 2 || 4 || 2 || 0 || 0.0 || 0.0 || 2.0 || 2.0 || 4.0 || 2.0 || 0.0 || 0
|-
| 2006 ||  || 29
| 7 || 1 || 0 || 52 || 39 || 91 || 41 || 8 || 0.1 || 0.0 || 7.4 || 5.6 || 13.0 || 5.9 || 1.1 || 0
|- style=background:#EAEAEA
| 2007 ||  || 29
| 4 || 2 || 2 || 33 || 22 || 55 || 27 || 10 || 0.5 || 0.5 || 8.3 || 5.5 || 13.8 || 6.8 || 2.5 || 0
|-
| 2008 ||  || 29
| 18 || 0 || 0 || 113 || 128 || 241 || 84 || 38 || 0.0 || 0.0 || 6.3 || 7.1 || 13.4 || 4.7 || 2.1 || 0
|- style=background:#EAEAEA
| 2009 ||  || 29
| 19 || 0 || 0 || 129 || 141 || 270 || 91 || 60 || 0.0 || 0.0 || 6.8 || 7.4 || 14.2 || 4.8 || 3.2 || 0
|-
| 2010 ||  || 29
| 21 || 0 || 0 || 151 || 156 || 307 || 110 || 40 || 0.0 || 0.0 || 7.2 || 7.4 || 14.6 || 5.2 || 1.9 || 0
|- style=background:#EAEAEA
| 2011 ||  || 29
| 19 || 0 || 0 || 172 || 107 || 279 || 111 || 41 || 0.0 || 0.0 || 9.1 || 5.6 || 14.7 || 5.8 || 2.2 || 0
|-
| 2012 ||  || 29
| 6 || 2 || 1 || 46 || 39 || 85 || 22 || 15 || 0.3 || 0.2 || 7.7 || 6.5 || 14.2 || 3.7 || 2.5 || 0
|- style=background:#EAEAEA
| 2013 ||  || 29
| 17 || 0 || 0 || 158 || 82 || 240 || 77 || 43 || 0.0 || 0.0 || 9.3 || 4.8 || 14.1 || 4.5 || 2.5 || 0
|-
| 2014 ||  || 29
| 1 || 0 || 0 || 10 || 3 || 13 || 4 || 2 || 0.0 || 0.0 || 10.0 || 3.0 || 13.0 || 4.0 || 2.0 || 0
|- class="sortbottom"
! colspan=3| Career
! 113 !! 5 !! 3 !! 866 !! 719 !! 1585 !! 569 !! 257 !! 0.0 !! 0.0 !! 7.7 !! 6.4 !! 14.0 !! 5.0 !! 2.3 !! 0
|}

Honours and achievements
Team
 Minor premiership: 2012

References

External links

1986 births
Living people
Hawthorn Football Club players
Australian rules footballers from Victoria (Australia)
Sandringham Dragons players
Gold Coast Football Club players
Box Hill Football Club players